Bohemian Rhapsody is a 2018 biographical film about Freddie Mercury, lead singer of the British rock band Queen. It follows the singer's life from when he joins the band in 1970 to their 1985 Live Aid performance at the former Wembley Stadium in London. A British-American venture, it was produced by 20th Century Fox, New Regency, GK Films, and Queen Films, with Fox serving as distributor. Directed by Bryan Singer, it was written by Anthony McCarten, and produced by Graham King and Queen manager Jim Beach. It stars Rami Malek as Mercury, with Lucy Boynton, Gwilym Lee, Ben Hardy, Joe Mazzello, Aidan Gillen, Tom Hollander, Allen Leech, and Mike Myers in supporting roles. Queen members Brian May and Roger Taylor served as consultants.

Bohemian Rhapsody received numerous accolades, including a leading four awards at the 91st Academy Awards for Best Actor (Malek), Best Film Editing, Best Sound Editing and Best Sound Mixing; it was also nominated for Best Picture, making it Fox's final standalone release to be nominated in that category before its acquisition by The Walt Disney Company on March 20, 2019. The film won Best Motion Picture – Drama at the 76th Golden Globe Awards, and was nominated for the Producers Guild of America Award for Best Theatrical Motion Picture and BAFTA Award for Best British Film, while Malek won the Golden Globe, Screen Actors Guild and BAFTA awards for Best Actor.

In the wake of the renewed sexual abuse allegations against director Bryan Singer, GLAAD withdrew Bohemian Rhapsody's nomination for the year's GLAAD Media Award in the Outstanding Film – Wide Release category. On 6 February 2019, the British Academy of Film and Television Arts removed Singer's name from Bohemian Rhapsody's nomination for the BAFTA Award for Best British Film.

Accolades

See also
 2018 in film

References

External links 
 

Lists of accolades by film